Conasprella coletteae is a species of sea snail, a marine gastropod mollusk in the family Conidae, the cone snails and their allies.

References

  Petuch E. (2013) Biogeography and biodiversity of western Atlantic mollusks. CRC Press. 252 pp.

External links
 To World Register of Marine Species

coletteae
Gastropods described in 2013